Manuel Ortega may refer to:
Manuel Ortega (singer) (born 1980), Austrian singer
Manuel Ortega (painter) (1921–2014), Spanish painter
Manuel Ortega Ocaña (born 1981), Spanish cyclist
Manuel Ortega, Emberá, corregimiento in Panama

See also
Emanuel Ortega, Argentine pop singer